The Tour 2013 "Shout to the Walls!" is a national and first hall tour by Japanese band Nico Touches the Walls, sponsored by New Balance, to promote their fifth studio album "Shout to the Walls", released on April 24, 2013. The tour started on May 16 and ended on July 11, 2013.

Set list

Tour dates

References

External links 
 Official website 
 A-Sketch's website for Nico Touches the Walls 

Concert tours of Japan